Empire Celtic was a ferry which was built in 1945 as Landing Ship, Tank LST 3512 for the Royal Navy. In 1946 she was chartered by the Atlantic Steam Navigation Company Ltd, converted to a ferry and renamed Empire Celtic. In 1956, she was requisitioned by the Royal Navy for a few months during the Suez Crisis as HMS Empire Cedric. She served until 1960 and was scrapped in 1965.

Description
The ship was ordered on 1 February 1944. She was built by Davie Shipbuilding & Repairing Co Ltd, Lauzon, Quebec, as yard number 335. She was launched on 25 April 1945, and completed in September.

The ship was propelled by a triple expansion steam engine. The engine was built by the Canadian Pacific Railway.

History
LST 3512 was commissioned into the Royal Navy on 7 August 1945. In 1946, she was chartered by the Atlantic Steam Navigation Co Ltd. She was rebuilt as a ferry by Harland & Wolff Ltd, Tilbury. She entered service on trooping duties on the Tilbury - Hamburg route. I 1955, the route was changed to Tilbury - Rotterdam. In 1956, Empire Celtic took part in Operation Musketeer. She was used to bring vehicles back to the United Kingdom from Egypt. Due to weather damage Empire Celtic had to divert to Malta for repairs. Empire Celtic was withdrawn from service in 1960. She was sold on 10 August 1962, and scrapped at La Spezia, Italy.

References

External links
Photo of Empire Celtic

1945 ships
Ships built in Quebec
LST (3)-class tank landing ships
Empire ships
Ministry of War Transport ships
Steamships of the United Kingdom
Ferries of the United Kingdom